Jacob Alan Scott (born 14 June 1995) is a British cyclist, who currently rides for UCI ProTeam .

Major results
2013
 1st  Points classification, Junior Tour of Wales
 8th Overall Sint-Martinusprijs Kontich
1st Stage 1
 9th Tour of Flanders Juniors
2017
 5th Antwerpse Havenpijl
 6th Ronde van Overijssel
2019
 1st  Mountains classification, Tour of Britain
 4th Rutland–Melton CiCLE Classic
2021
 1st  Marathon, National MTB Championships
 Tour of Britain
1st  Mountains classification
1st  Sprints classification
2022
 1st Stockton GP
 1st Barnsley, National Circuit Series
 3rd Rutland–Melton CiCLE Classic
 7th Grote Prijs Jef Scherens
 8th Midden-Brabant Poort Omloop

References

External links

1995 births
Living people
British male cyclists
English male cyclists
People from Oldham